Caelostomus is a genus of beetles in the family Carabidae. It contains the following species:

References

 
Pterostichinae
Carabidae genera
Taxa named by William Sharp Macleay